Ultimate legs are a pair of modified rear legs unique to centipedes. Although they do not aid in locomotion, ultimate legs are used for a variety of uses, and their morphology varies accordingly.

Sexual dimorphism is frequently present.

Usage

As a defence against predators 
In many species, ultimate legs are used in warning postures to scare of predators. The ultimate legs are raised, splayed, and sometimes waved back and forth. The presence of spines on the ultimate legs of some species also serves a defensive role- as Lewis & Kronmüller (2015) put it, "a predator approaching from behind would come into contact with a battery of spines."

For suspension 
Some species use their ultimate legs to hang or anchor themselves from trees or other desired objects. This has been recorded as playing a role in predation; the centipede suspends itself in the air and swings back and forth to capture prey.

In contact with other centipedes 

Before mating, many species of Scolopendrid centipedes interlock ultimate legs. A similar behaviour has been recorded in ordinary meetings, wherein each centipede grasps the other's trunk with its ultimate legs. This possibly serves as a way to defuse aggression, and in some species may be held for several minutes.

During mating, Scutigera coleoptrata raise and lower their ultimate legs, along with their antennae.

As a means of sound production 
Members of the genus Alipes stridulate their leaf-like ultimate legs, probably as a way to warn off predators. The legs continue to stridulate for up to half a minute if detached from the centipede.

The ultimate legs of Rhysida immarginata togoensis emit a faint creaking or squeaking sound when detached and bent.

References 

Myriapod anatomy
Centipedes